The president of Columbia University is the chief officer of Columbia University in New York City. The position was first created in 1754 by the original royal charter for the university, issued by George II, and the power to appoint the president was given to an autonomous board of trustees. The university suspended operations upon the outbreak of the American Revolutionary War, during which no individual served as president. When it was resuscitated by the New York State Legislature, the university was placed directly under the control of the Board of Regents of the University of the State of New York; its chancellor, George Clinton, served as the de facto president of Columbia University. Through the efforts of Alexander Hamilton and John Jay, control of the university was returned to a private board of trustees in 1787, which has to this day maintained the right to appoint or remove the president, who also serves on the board ex officio.

The university's first president was Samuel Johnson, who held the office from 1754 to 1763, and its 19th and current president is Lee Bollinger, whose tenure began in 2002. Upon the founding of the university, it was stipulated by the vestrymen of Trinity Church, on whose land King's College sat, that every president must be a member of the Church of England; otherwise, the land would revert back to the church. As such, every single president of the university until the appointment of Dwight D. Eisenhower was Anglican, while the first six presidents, with the exception of William Samuel Johnson, were all either Anglican priests or bishops. Michael I. Sovern, appointed in 1980, was the university's first Jewish president. From 1902 to 1970, every president was involved in foreign relations in some capacity: Nicholas Murray Butler was the president of the Carnegie Endowment for International Peace from 1925 to 1945, and was awarded a Nobel Peace Prize for his promotion of the Kellogg–Briand Pact; Dwight D. Eisenhower served as Supreme Commander of the Allied Expeditionary Force during World War II, and after his tenure would serve as President of the United States; and Grayson L. Kirk and Andrew W. Cordier were both instrumental to the formation of the United Nations.

As established by Columbia University's governing statutes, it is the duty of the president to exercise jurisdiction over all affairs of the university; to call special meetings of the University Senate, faculties, and administration; to report to the Trustees of Columbia on the state and needs of the university annually; and to administer discipline. The consent of the president is necessary for any act made by a faculty or administrative board, unless their veto is overridden by two-thirds vote. Additionally, the president is able to grant leaves of absences, give faculty permission to use university laboratories for experiments, and confer academic and honorary degrees on behalf of the board of trustees.

The president is ex officio a permanent member of the Pulitzer Prize Board, and has annually presented the awards to its recipients since 1984.

List of presidents

References

Columbia University
Columbia University-related lists
Columbia